The 2015 Labour Party deputy leadership election was triggered on 8 May 2015 by the resignation of Harriet Harman as Deputy Leader of the Labour Party of the United Kingdom following the party's defeat at the 2015 General Election. Harman, the Deputy Leader of the Labour Party, became Acting Leader following Leader Ed Miliband's resignation. Harman announced on the same day that she would step down as Deputy Leader, with her resignation taking effect when the new Leader and Deputy Leader are elected.

Five candidates were successfully nominated to stand in the deputy leadership election: Ben Bradshaw, Stella Creasy, Angela Eagle, Caroline Flint, and Tom Watson. The voting process began on Friday 14 August 2015 and closed on Thursday 10 September 2015, with the results being announced on Saturday 12 September 2015. Voting was by Labour Party members and registered and affiliated supporters, using the alternative vote system.

Tom Watson was elected deputy leader with 50.7% of the vote on the third ballot.

Procedure
The leadership election, triggered by Harman's resignation, took place under the reformed rules adopted from the proposals of the February 2014 Collins Report, which was led by Ray Collins. The plan entailed a shorter election than the one that took place in 2010, with a new deputy leader in place before Labour's party conference in September 2015.

The review changed the way in which Labour elects leaders. Under the former system, a three-way electoral college chose the leader, with one-third weight given to the votes of the Parliamentary Labour Party (i.e. Labour members of the House of Commons) and Labour members of the European Parliament; one-third to individual Labour Party members, and one third to the trade union and affiliated societies sections. Ed Miliband famously won after a large victory in the third of these colleges.

Following the Collins review, this system was replaced by a "one member, one vote" (OMOV) system. Candidates were elected by members and registered and affiliated supporters, who all received a maximum of one vote. This meant that, for example, members of Labour-affiliated trade unions needed to register as Labour supporters in order to vote.

In order to stand, candidates needed to have been nominated by at least 15% of the Parliamentary Labour Party (PLP) – 35 MPs. The vote, as in previous elections, was held by the alternative vote (instant-runoff) system. The leadership election was held under the same rules.

A meeting of Labour's National Executive Committee took place on 13 May 2015 to set a timetable and procedure for the two elections.
 Tuesday 9 June 2015 – Nominations open
 Monday 15 June 2015 (12:00) – Nominations for the Leader close
 Wednesday 17 June 2015 (12:00) – Nominations for the Deputy Leader close
 Wednesday 17 June 2015 (12:00) – Hustings period open
 Friday 31 July 2015 (12:00) – Supporting nominations close
 Wednesday 12 August 2015 (12:00) – Last date to join as member, affiliated support or registered supporter and be able to vote
 Friday 14 August 2015 – Ballot papers sent out
 Thursday 10 September 2015 (12:00) – Ballot closes
 Saturday 12 September 2015 – Special Conference announce the results

Candidates for Deputy Leader

Declared
 Ben Bradshaw, former Shadow Secretary of State for Culture, Media and Sport, former Secretary of State for Culture, Media and Sport and MP for Exeter
 Stella Creasy, Shadow Business Minister and MP for Walthamstow
 Angela Eagle, Shadow Leader of the House of Commons, former Exchequer Secretary to the Treasury and MP for Wallasey
 Caroline Flint, Shadow Secretary of State for Energy and Climate Change, former Minister of State for Europe and MP for Don Valley
 Tom Watson, former Deputy Chair of the Labour Party, former Parliamentary Secretary for the Cabinet Office and MP for West Bromwich East

Withdrawn
 John Healey, former Secretary of State for Health|Shadow Secretary of State for Health, former Minister of State for Housing and Planning and MP for Wentworth and Dearne
 Rushanara Ali, former Shadow Minister for Education and MP for Bethnal Green and Bow

Declined
 Simon Danczuk, MP for Rochdale (endorsed Caroline Flint)
 Gloria De Piero, Shadow Minister for Women and Equalities and MP for Ashfield (endorsed Tom Watson)

Flint was viewed as a Blairite, while Watson was viewed as having close links to the trade unions. One party source was anonymously quoted in the Financial Times as comparing a potential contest between Flint and Watson to the hotly contested 1981 deputy leadership election between Denis Healey and the leftist Tony Benn.

MP nominations for candidates
To be placed on the ballot, candidates for deputy leader must have obtained the nominations of 35 MPs. The number of MPs next to the candidate's name includes the actual candidate too, as they can count as one of the 35 MPs needed. Members with bold numbers succeeded to get the 35 nominations needed to make the ballot. Nominations for candidates by MPs were:

Tom Watson (62): Dave Anderson, Jon Ashworth, Ian Austin, Adrian Bailey, Kevin Brennan, Richard Burden, Richard Burgon, Liam Byrne, Ronnie Campbell, Vernon Coaker, David Crausby, Jon Cruddas, Judith Cummins, Jim Cunningham, Gloria De Piero, Michael Dugher, Paul Farrelly, Rob Flello, Colleen Fletcher, Vicky Foxcroft, Roger Godsiff, Louise Haigh, Harry Harpham, Sue Hayman, Stephen Hepburn, Imran Hussain, Kevan Jones, Helen Jones, Barbara Keeley, Ian Lavery, Emma Lewell-Buck, Clive Lewis, Rebecca Long-Bailey, Ian Lucas, Justin Madders, Khalid Mahmood, Shabana Mahmood, Rob Marris, Chris Matheson, Stephen McCabe, Andy McDonald, Conor McGinn, Alan Meale, Ian Mearns, Grahame Morris, Lisa Nandy, Kate Osamor, Jess Phillips, Lucy Powell, Rachel Reeves, Geoffrey Robinson, Naz Shah, Virendra Sharma, Dennis Skinner, Ruth Smeeth, Jeff Smith, Nick Smith, John Spellar, Jo Stevens, David Winnick, Iain Wright
Caroline Flint (43): Kevin Barron, Hilary Benn, Luciana Berger, Tom Blenkinsop, Ann Coffey, Alex Cunningham, Nic Dakin, Simon Danczuk, Wayne David, Jim Dowd, Peter Dowd, Jack Dromey, Julie Elliott, Jim Fitzpatrick, Yvonne Fovargue, Barry Gardiner, Mary Glindon, David Hanson, Carolyn Harris, Margaret Hodge, Kate Hoey, George Howarth, Graham Jones, Gerald Kaufman, Stephen Kinnock, Siobhain McDonagh, Pat McFadden, Jessica Morden, Albert Owen, Toby Perkins, Johnny Reynolds, Emma Reynolds, Joan Ryan, Barry Sheerman, Owen Smith, Angela Smith, Gisela Stuart, Nick Thomas-Symonds, Anna Turley, Karl Turner, Alan Whitehead, Phil Wilson
Angela Eagle (38): Margaret Beckett, Roberta Blackman-Woods, Paul Blomfield, Nick Brown, Dawn Butler, Ann Clwyd, Julie Cooper, Maria Eagle, Bill Esterson, Mike Gapes, Pat Glass, Lilian Greenwood, Margaret Greenwood, Nia Griffith, Andrew Gwynne, John Healey, Mark Hendrick, Sharon Hodgson, Kelvin Hopkins, Seema Malhotra, Rachael Maskell, John McDonnell, Alison McGovern, Liz McInnes, Michael Meacher, Teresa Pearce, Stephen Pound, Angela Rayner, Christina Rees, Marie Rimmer, Steve Rotheram, Tulip Siddiq, Cat Smith, Jon Trickett, Derek Twigg, Keith Vaz, Daniel Zeichner
Ben Bradshaw (37): Heidi Alexander, Rushanara Ali, Clive Betts, Lyn Brown, Chris Bryant, Karen Buck, Neil Coyle, Geraint Davies, Thangam Debbonaire, Clive Efford, Chris Evans, Frank Field, Paul Flynn, Helen Goodman, Fabian Hamilton, Meg Hillier, Tristram Hunt, Rupa Huq, Huw Irranca-Davies, Alan Johnson, Diana Johnson, Susan Elan Jones, Sadiq Khan, Peter Kyle, Gordon Marsden, Kerry McCarthy, Catherine McKinnell, Matthew Pennycook, Bridget Phillipson, Yasmin Qureshi, Andy Slaughter, Andrew Smith, Keir Starmer, Emily Thornberry, Stephen Timms, Valerie Vaz
Stella Creasy (35): Diane Abbott, Debbie Abrahams, Ruth Cadbury, Sarah Champion, Jenny Chapman, Jo Cox, Stephen Doughty, Louise Ellman, Kate Green, Helen Hayes, Kate Hollern, Dan Jarvis, Gerald Jones, Mike Kane, David Lammy, Chris Leslie, Ivan Lewis, Holly Lynch, Fiona Mactaggart, Madeleine Moon, Ian Murray, Melanie Onn, Chi Onwurah, Jamie Reed, Steve Reed, Gavin Shuker, Karin Smyth, Wes Streeting, Graham Stringer, Gareth Thomas , Stephen Twigg, Chuka Umunna, Catherine West, John Woodcock

Before dropping out of the race on 17 June, Rushanara Ali had the following 24 nominations: Roberta Blackman-Woods, Paul Blomfield, Lyn Brown, Dawn Butler, Julie Cooper, Jeremy Corbyn, Clive Efford, Fabian Hamilton, Helen Hayes, Tristram Hunt, Rupa Huq, Sadiq Khan, Seema Malhotra, John Mann, John McDonnell, Chi Onwurah, Teresa Pearce, Matthew Pennycook, Yasmin Qureshi, Dennis Skinner, Andy Slaughter, Keir Starmer, Chuka Umunna

Before dropping out of the race on 11 June, John Healey had the following 20 nominations: Sarah Champion, Clive Efford, Holly Lynch, Kevin Barron, Andy Slaughter, Clive Betts, Ruth Cadbury, Simon Danczuk, Louise Ellman, Fabian Hamilton, Harry Harpham, Madeleine Moon, Paula Sherriff, Derek Twigg, Paul Blomfield, Ivan Lewis, Gordon Marsden, Chris Leslie, Teresa Pearce

Opinion polling

Result 

Source:

See also
 2015 Labour Party leadership election (UK)
 2015 Scottish Labour Party leadership election
 2015 Liberal Democrats leadership election

References

Labour Party deputy leadership
2015
Labour Party deputy leadership election
Labour Party deputy leadership election
Labour Party deputy leadership election